Mangalore University commonly known as, MU is a public university in Konaje, Mangaluru, Karnataka, India. In 2021, National Assessment and Accreditation Council (NAAC) awarded Mangalore University 'A' grade.

History

Mangalore University was established in 1980 with jurisdiction over the districts of Udupi, Dakshina Kannada and Kodagu.

Academics
Started with only three post-graduate departments, Mangalore university now has 26 post-graduate departments. Mangalore university has 2 constituent colleges, 5 autonomous colleges and more than 200 colleges affiliated to it. The university also has a post-graduate center at Chikka Aluvara, Kushalanagar.

Mangalore University for the first time this academic year 2022 onwards has introduced an advanced programme for Masters in Public Health (MPH) which is a two-year full-time programme that will be offered by Affiliated Institutes with Mangalore University.

Research Centres
Centre for Advanced Research in Environmental Radioactivity (CARER), an advanced centre for radioecological and radiation protection research with collaborations with many laboratories of the world.
Centre for Application of Radioisotopes and Radiation Technology (CARRT), been established in collaboration with Department of Atomic Energy (DAE), Board of Research in Nuclear Sciences (BRNS) and Board of Radiation and Isotope Technology (BRIT).
Microtron Centre
NMR Instrument Centre
DST-PURSE Research Facility
Kanakadasa Research Centre

Notable alumni

V. G. Siddhartha, Indian businessman and founder of Cafe Coffee Day
D. V. Sadananda Gowda, Indian politician 
Veerappa Moily, Indian politician and writer

References

External links

Mangalore University
Educational institutions established in 1980
Universities in Mangalore
1980 establishments in Karnataka